Bittor Alkiza Fernández (born 26 October 1970) is a Spanish former professional footballer who played for both Real Sociedad and Athletic Bilbao as a midfielder.

He amassed La Liga totals of 417 games and 19 goals over 14 seasons, and was also a Spanish international in the late 90s.

Club career
Born in San Sebastián, Gipuzkoa, Alkiza made his professional debut with local giants Real Sociedad, being promoted to the first team at only 20 and making 105 official appearances in his first three seasons. After an aborted transfer to Real Madrid, he eventually moved to Basque neighbours Athletic Bilbao in 1994, for 220 million pesetas.

Alkiza was also first choice at the San Mamés Stadium, not scoring so often as the attacking duties in midfield were more often than not the task of future club great Julen Guerrero. In the 1997–98 campaign he only missed one La Liga game – 3,146 minutes of action – as the side finished in second place and qualified for the UEFA Champions League. In the latter competition, even though Athletic ranked last in their group, they did draw 0–0 at home against Juventus FC, the finalists of the previous three editions, with him playing the full 90 minutes.

In summer 2003, after 328 competitive matches, Alkiza returned to Real Sociedad who were due taking part in the season's Champions League. At 33 his debut campaign was satisfactory, but he eventually retired from the game after not being able to heal a degenerative injury from early seasons; both teams combined, he surpassed the 500-games mark.

Alkiza later rejoined his last professional club, being charged with Real Sociedad's youth teams.

International career
Alkiza played three times for Spain, in a two-month span. His debut came on 23 September 1998 in a friendly with Russia, in Granada: he scored the match's only goal, netting from outside the area.

International goal
Score and result list Spain's goal tally first, score column indicates score after Alkiza goal.

Style of play
Although his natural position was that of left midfielder, Alkiza could also play as a central one. He had a more than remarkable technique and a powerful mid-range shot coming in second line, combined with good passing and tackling abilities.

Personal life
Alkiza's father, Iñaki, also played for some years with Real Sociedad, later serving as the club's president. He was also a relatively important local politician.

He broke the "curse" that stated that players from Real would never succeed at Athletic (Loren, Luciano Iturrino or David Villabona).

Coach Javier Irureta, who managed him at Athletic in 1994–95, said of Alkiza: "I guarantee that if you pass him the ball he will not return a melon".

See also
 List of Athletic Bilbao players (+200 appearances)
 List of La Liga players (400+ appearances)

References

External links
 
 
 
 

1970 births
Living people
Footballers from San Sebastián
Spanish footballers
Association football midfielders
La Liga players
Segunda División B players
Real Sociedad B footballers
Real Sociedad footballers
Athletic Bilbao footballers
Spain youth international footballers
Spain international footballers
Basque Country international footballers
Real Sociedad non-playing staff